Carol Arthur Fellowes, 4th Baron Ailwyn, TD (23 November 1896 – 27 September 1988) was a British peer, the son of Ailwyn Edward Fellowes, 1st Baron Ailwyn. He was known as the Honourable Carol Fellowes from 1921, when his father was raised to the peerage, until he succeeded to the barony on 23 March 1976.

Early life
Carol Fellowes was educated at the Royal Naval Colleges at Osborne and Dartmouth. However, he entered the British Army during World War I.

In the 1930s he worked as agent to the Earl of Strafford on the Wrotham Park Estate, living at the Home Farm.

Military career
During World War I Carol Fellowes served as a lieutenant in the Royal Norfolk Regiment in Mesopotamia (1917–19). In 1937 he was commissioned as a major in the Territorial Army to command the newly raised 334th Anti-Aircraft Company, Royal Engineers, at Barnet. The company formed part of 33rd (St Pancras) Anti-Aircraft Battalion based at Regent's Park. He commanded of the battery during the Phoney War period, and was then posted to the staff of Anti-Aircraft Command for the rest of the war. He was awarded the Territorial Decoration.

Public service
He served as a Justice of the Peace for Hertfordshire and Middlesex.

Family
Carol Fellowes married, on 16 November 1936, Mrs Caroline Alice Cudemore (d.1985), daughter of Maynard Cowan of Victoria, British Columbia.

Lord Ailwyn died, without issue, on 27 September 1988, at which point the barony became extinct.

Notes

References
 Burke's Peerage, Baronetage and Knightage, 100th Edn, London, 1953.
 Col J.D. Sainsbury, The Hertfordshire Yeomanry Regiments, Royal Artillery, Part 2: The Heavy Anti-Aircraft Regiment 1938–1945 and the Searchlight Battery 1937–1945; Part 3: The Post-war Units 1947–2002, Welwyn: Hertfordshire Yeomanry and Artillery Trust/Hart Books, 2003, .

4
Ailwyn, Carol Fellowes, 3rd Baron of
Ailwyn, Carol Fellowes, 3rd Baron of
Royal Navy officers of World War I